Bjorgum Farm Airport  was located  north of Bjorgum Farm, Alberta, Canada. Camrose Airport is located nearby.

References

External links
Place to Fly on COPA's Places to Fly airport directory

Defunct airports in Alberta
Camrose County